Marija Vuković (born 25 March 1990) is a Serbian footballer who plays as a forward and has appeared for the Serbia women's national team.

Career
Vuković has been capped for the Serbia national team, appearing for the team during the 2019 FIFA Women's World Cup qualifying cycle.

References

External links
 
 
 

1990 births
Living people
Serbian women's footballers
Serbia women's international footballers
Women's association football forwards
Serbian expatriate footballers
Serbian expatriate sportspeople in Russia
Expatriate women's footballers in Russia
Ryazan-VDV players